Richard Jacobs may refer to:

Richard Jacobs (businessman) (1925–2009), co-founder of The Richard E. Jacobs Group; former owner of the Cleveland Indians
Richard Jacobs (rabbi) (born 1956), U.S. Reform rabbi
Dick Jacobs (1918–1988), American musician
Rich Jacobs (born 1972), American artist
Rick Jacobs, founder and chair of the Courage Campaign

See also

Richard Jacob (disambiguation)